"Years" is a song written by Kye Fleming and Dennis Morgan, and recorded by American country music artist Barbara Mandrell. It was released in December 1979 as the second single from the album Just for the Record. The song was Mandrell's third number one on the country chart. It stayed at number one for a single week and spent a total of ten weeks in the country top 40.

Charts

Weekly charts

Year-end charts

Wayne Newton cover
A cover version by Wayne Newton was released as a single in 1980 and reached #35 on the Billboard Hot 100, his last Top 40 hit.

References

1979 singles
Barbara Mandrell songs
Wayne Newton songs
Songs written by Kye Fleming
Songs written by Dennis Morgan (songwriter)
Song recordings produced by Tom Collins (record producer)
MCA Records singles
1979 songs